ESPN Books is a publishing company operated by ESPN Started in 2004, ESPN Books has published almost 20 books. ESPN Books also is in charge of producing ESPN's yearly sports encyclopedia. It also controls its own book club and in addition it ranks the top selling sports books in ESPN Borders. Since 2008, it has co-published its books with Ballantine Books.

Authors that have written books for ESPN Books include, Bill Simmons, Peter Keating and Ralph Wiley.

Books published by ESPN Books
2007 ESPN Sports Almanac, Mike Morrison and Gerry Brown
23 Ways To Get To First Base, Gary Belsky and Neil Fine
After Jackie, Cal Fussman
Ali Rap, George Lois
The Best Hand I Ever Played, Steve Rosenbloom
Classic Wiley, Ralph Wiley
The Dale Earnhardt Story, Introduction by Kenny Mayne
Dingers!, Peter Keating
ESPN Baseball Sudoku, no author
ESPN College Football Encyclopedia, Michael MacCambridge
Man in the Middle, John Amaechi
Meat Market: Inside the Smash-Mouth World of College Football Recruiting, Bruce Feldman
The New Gold Standard, Tim Prister
Now I Can Die In Peace, Bill Simmons
Online Ace, Scott Fischman
Parting Shots From The World of Sports, Steve Wulf
Rules of the Red Rubber Ball, Kevin Carroll
The Sixth Man, Chris Palmer
The Ultimate Highlight Reel, no author

External links
ESPN Books official website

Books
Book publishing companies of the United States